André Girard (born 22 April 1909 in Cahors, died 4 June 1993 in La Mulatière, near Lyon) was a French civil servant and Resistance worker with the ALLIANCE network.

Life

Pre-war
Girard worked for the Société d'exploitation industrielle des tabacs et des allumettes in France from 1929 onwards.

French Resistance
He was captured at the Battle of Dunkirk in 1940, but escaped from Germany in 1941 to Brive-la-Gaillarde and soon joined the French Resistance.

Under the pseudonym "Pointer", Girard was the regional head of the Alliance or "Arche de Noé" resistance network in occupied France from 1940 to 1945, the only network whose supreme commander was a woman, Marie-Madeleine Fourcade (Alias "Hérisson").  This network was notable for giving almost all of its three thousand agents codenames based on animals : Bleu d'Auvergne, Setter, Labrador, Bichon, Abeille, Aigle... Divided up by region, the network's central command was "Hôpital" (centre-west sector), which Girard led from 1943 to September 1944. In 1944, his sector numbered 185 main agents across 16 départements, from south of the Loire to north of the Garonne, a sector particularly marked by the Tulle and Oradour-sur-Glane massacres. Its agents were from diverse social backgrounds – the mayor of La Rochelle and colonel in the reserve Léonce Vieljeux, the student Roland Creel, the vicar of Tulle cathedral Charles Lair, the usselois doctor Jean Sirieix, the intelligence commissioner Henry Castaing, the briviste businessman Pierre Bordes, the secretary-general to the council of Guéret Roland Deroubaix, the creusois lawyer René Nouguès or the electrician Vincent Renaud, as well as civil servants, peasants, surgeons, railway workers, architects, and ushers.

On 30 June 1945, charged with a mission of the utmost importance for the Direction générale des études et recherches and promoted to captain, he was demobbed at his own request. Returning to his pre-war job, he was transferred to the tobacco factory at Riom before becoming administrative director and inspector of the tobacco factory at Lyon until his retirement. He also succeeded Jacques Soustelle on the municipal council of Lyon in 1962 under Louis Pradel.  He was for several years the national treasurer of the Old Comrades association for the ALLIANCE network. He published his war memoirs in 1965 with éditions France-Empire under the title "Le temps de la méprise".

He is buried in the cemetery at Saint-Sauves d'Auvergne.

Medals 
 Officier de la Légion d'honneur
 Croix de guerre 1939–1945, 2 citations
 Médaille de la Résistance
 Médaille des évadés
 Croix du combattant volontaire
 Croix du combattant volontaire de la Résistance
 Insigne des blessés militaires
 Croix du combattant de l'Europe
 Croix d'honneur du mérite Franco-britannique
 King's Medal for Courage in the Cause of Freedom (UK)

Sources 
 Le temps de la méprise, by André Girard, éditions France-Empire, 1965
 L'arche de noé, by Marie-Madeleine Fourcade, éditions Fayard, 1968
 Les SS en Limousin, Quercy et Périgord, by Georges Beau and Léopold Gaubusseau, éditions des Presses de la Cité, 1969
 Marie-Madeleine Fourcade, un chef de la Résistance, by Michèle Cointet, éditions Perrin, 2006
 Centre national d'études de la Résistance et de la Déportation Edmond Michelet, 4 rue Champanatier, 19100 Brive-la-Gaillarde

External links 
 Site on André Girard and the Alliance network

1909 births
1993 deaths
People from Cahors
French Resistance members
Recipients of the Croix de Guerre 1939–1945 (France)
Officiers of the Légion d'honneur
Recipients of the Resistance Medal
Recipients of the King's Medal for Courage in the Cause of Freedom
French prisoners of war in World War II
World War II prisoners of war held by Germany
French escapees
Escapees from German detention
French Army personnel of World War II